Pope John XXIII created 52 cardinals in five consistories. Beginning at his first consistory, he expanded the size of the College beyond the limit of seventy established in 1586 and on several occasions announced that further increases should be expected. It rose to 88 in January 1961. He named three additional cardinals in pectore, that is, secretly, but did not reveal their names before his death.

In 1962 he initiated the rule that all cardinals should be bishops. He consecrated the twelve non-bishop members of the College himself in April. He created one cardinal who later became pope, Pope Paul VI. His cardinals included the first from Japan, Mexico, the Philippines, Uruguay, and Venezuela; Rugambwa was the first native of Africa.

John’s creation of cardinals at annual consistories was a marked departure from the periods of several years that his predecessor Pius XII allowed between consistories and a return to the frequency of earlier in the 20th century.

15 December 1958

Pope John announced the names of 23 new cardinals on 17 November 1958, including 13 Italians, ten of whom held offices in the Roman Curia. Though not as international a group as those named by his predecessor Pius XII, it included the first cardinals from Mexico and Uruguay. This would have increased the number of cardinals to 75, breaking the ceiling of 70 members established by Pope Sixtus V in 1586, but it only reached 74 because Cardinal José María Caro Rodríguez of Chile died before the consistory. When he created these cardinals, 18 of the order of cardinal priests and five cardinal deacons, at a secret consistory on 15 December, John said the increase was necessary to staff church offices properly. Church law had to be waived for the new Cardinal Cicognani to join his brother Gaetano Cicognani, a cardinal since 1953, in the College. On 17 December Pope John gave red birettas and assigned titular churches and deaconries to the twenty of the 23 who were present. Cento, Fietta, and Bueno y Monreal received theirs on 12 March 1959.

14 December 1959
Pope John announced the names of eight new cardinals on 16 November 1959, increasing the size of the College to 79, including 31 Italians. On 14 December 1959, Pius created four cardinal priests and four cardinal deacons, and on 17 December he gave red birettas and titular churches and deaconries to seven of them. He did the same for Marella on 31 March 1960.

28 March 1960

Pope John announced the names of seven new cardinals on 3 March 1960, among them the first Japanese (Doi) and Filipino (Santos) cardinals and the first black cardinal of the modern era (Rugambwa). At the secret consistory on 28 March, he noted the historic significance of their inclusion by addressing them: "Dear and venerable brothers of Tokyo, Manila and Rutabo, please tell your populations that the Pope loves them." He named three additional cardinals in pectore, keeping their identities secret. He created six cardinal priests and one cardinal deacon (Bacci) on that day, and on 31 March gave them all their birettas, six their titles and one his deaconry. Without those not named publicly, this consistory brought the number of cardinals to 85. The Italians numbered 33.

Because Pope John failed to reveal the names of the three cardinals created in pectore before his death, their appointments never took effect.

16 January 1961
On 16 December 1960, Pope John announced the names of four new cardinals, including the first Venezuelan. On 16 January 1961, he created them cardinal priests, and they received their red hats and their titular church assignments on 19 January. Following this consistory there were 88 cardinals, 32 of them Italians.

19 March 1962

Pope John announced the names of ten new cardinals on 17 February 1962. They included an Eastern-rite Catholic, the Syrian-born Coussa, and a new youngest member of the College of Cardinals, Landázuri, aged 48. Pope John created them eight cardinal priests and two cardinal deacons on 19 March and gave eight of them their titles and deaconries on 22 March.· The other two, Panico and Antoniutti, the Apostolic Nuncios to Portugal and Spain, received theirs on 24 May 1962. The consistory on 19 March left the college with 87 cardinals, including thirty Italian, eight French, six Spanish, and five from the United States.

On 19 March Pope John also announced that he would consecrate as bishops the twelve members of the College not yet bishops, including two of the newest cardinals, Browne and Albareda, and a veteran of the Roman Curia Alfredo Ottaviani.

Notes

References

Additional sources

External links

John XXIII
20th-century Catholicism
College of Cardinals
 
1958 in Christianity
1959 in Christianity
1960 in Christianity
1961 in Christianity
1962 in Christianity